Thor Ericsson (9 October 1885 – 20 April 1975) was a Swedish footballer who played as a midfielder. He represented Örgryte IS with whom he won three Swedish Championships. He made four appearances for the Sweden national team between 1908 and 1910. His name is sometimes spelled as Thor Eriksson.

Honours 
Örgryte IS
 Swedish Champion: 1906, 1907, 1909

References

External links
 

1885 births
1975 deaths
Footballers from Gothenburg
Swedish footballers
Association football midfielders
Sweden international footballers
Örgryte IS players